This is a list of games developed by Climax Studios (formerly Images Software and then The Climax Group).

List of games

References

External links 

Climax
Video games developed in the United Kingdom